(David) Grahame Hardie FRS, FRSE, FMedSci is a Scottish biochemist, and Professor of Cellular Signalling, at the School of Life Sciences, University of Dundee.

Career and research
He was a member of the Faculty of 1000. He is the father of AMPK.

Publications
"Regulation of AMP-activated protein kinase by natural and synthetic activators", Acta Pharmaceutica Sinica B (2016) 6, (1–19)
"AMP-activated protein kinase: a cellular energy sensor with a key role in metabolic disorders and in cancer", Biochemical Society Transactions (2011) 39, (1–13)

References

External links
http://www.biomedcentral.com/authors/profiles/grahamehardie
https://web.archive.org/web/20120426072341/http://mediacentral.cshl.edu/Symposium76/Symposium76/Interviews/Entries/2011/6/5_Grahame_Hardie.html
http://homecomingscotlandblog.blogspot.com/2008/10/professor-grahame-hardie-frs-frse.html

Scottish biochemists
Academics of the University of Dundee
Fellows of the Royal Society
Fellows of the Royal Society of Edinburgh
Fellows of the Academy of Medical Sciences (United Kingdom)
Living people
Year of birth missing (living people)